Type 52 may refer to:
 Bugatti Type 52, motor vehicle produced by the auto-maker Bugatti
 Bristol Type 52 Bullfinch, an experimental British military aircraft first flown in 1922
 Type 052 destroyer, a destroyer class of the People's Liberation Army Navy
 Type 052B destroyer, a destroyer class of the People's Liberation Army Navy
 Type 052C destroyer, a destroyer class of the People's Liberation Army Navy
 Type 052D destroyer, a destroyer class of the People's Liberation Army Navy
 Type 52, 75 mm caliber recoilless rifle